Hell is Empty is a 1967 British crime film. It began filming in 1965 under the direction of Bernard Knowles. Filming was suspended and later resumed by John Ainsworth after Martine Carol's death. It also starred Anthony Steel, Shirley Anne Field and James Robertson Justice.

Premise
On the run from the police, thieves stumble upon  an abandoned mansion on a deserted island.

Cast
Martine Carol as Martine Grant
Anthony Steel as Major Morton
James Robertson Justice as Angus McGee
Shirley Anne Field as Shirley McGee
Isa Miranda as Isa Grant
Carl Möhner as Carl Schultz
Robert Rietti as Robert Grant
Jess Conrad as Jess Shepherd
Anthony Dawson as Paul Grant
Catherine Schell as Catherine Grant (as Catherine von Schell)
Irene von Meyendorff as Helen McGee
Patricia Viterbo as Patricia
Anna Gaël as Anna
Eugene Deckers as Counsel
Sheila Burrell as Judge

Production
The film was made by a new company, Absorbing Films, which had been set up by Michael Eaton-Eland, a prominent London figure, who wanted to move into filmmaking. Filming started in December 1965 on the isle of Capri. It was Martine Carol's first movie in three years. It was one of a number of films Steel made in Europe.

The film was shot in Italy and Yugoslavia. However several of the actors and technicians claimed they had not been paid. Filming came to a halt. Carole married Eaton-Eland in June 1966, at which stage the film had not been completed.

Carol died of a heart attack in February 1967. Production resumed under another director.

Reception
The Monthly Film Bulletin criticised its "nonsensical story".

References

Bibliography
 Chibnall, Steve & Murphy, Robert. British Crime Cinema. Routledge, 2005.

External links

Hell is Empty at Letterbox DVD
Hell is Empty at BFI

1967 films
Films directed by Bernard Knowles
British crime films
1960s crime films
Films set in Prague
Films shot in Prague
1960s English-language films
1960s British films